Thomas Pryce is the name of:

 Thomas Pryce (1886–1918), First World War British Army officer, recipient of the Victoria Cross
 Thomas Parry Pryce (died 1953), Welsh Anglican priest, second Archdeacon of Newport
 Tom Pryce (1949–1977), Welsh racing driver
 Tom ap Rhys Pryce (1974–2006), British lawyer murdered by two teenagers

See also
 Thomas Pryce-Jenkins (1862–1922), Welsh international rugby union player
 Thomas Price (disambiguation)
 Tom Price (disambiguation)